The University of Wales Press was founded in 1922 as a central service of the University of Wales. The press publishes academic journals and around seventy books a year in the English and Welsh languages on six general subjects: history, political philosophy and religious studies, welsh and Celtic studies, literary studies, European studies and medieval studies. The press has a backlist of over 3,500 titles.

The main offices of the University of Wales Press are in Cardiff.

With the announcement that the University of Wales will be merged into Trinity Saint David, the University of Wales Press will also be merged into the institution.

In September 2016 it was announced they would be forming a partnership with the Open Library of Humanities to convert the International Journal of Welsh Writing in English into a full open-access journal.

See also
Merthyr Tudfil in 1851

References

1922 establishments in Wales
Publishing companies of Wales
Publishing companies established in 1922
Wales, University of
Press
British companies established in 1922